{{DISPLAYTITLE:Mu1 Chamaeleontis}}

μ1 Chamaeleontis, Latinized as Mu1 Chamaeleontis, is a single star in the southern circumpolar constellation Chamaeleon. It is dimly visible to the naked eye with an apparent visual magnitude of 5.53. Based upon parallax measurements, it is located approximately 403 light-years away from the Sun. The radial velocity is poorly constrained, but it appears to be drifting further away at the rate of about 

This object has a stellar classification of A0 IV, matching an A-type subgiant star. Mu1 Chamaeleontis' metallicity – elements heavier than helium – is 66% that of the Sun.

References 

A-type subgiants
Chamaeleon (constellation)
Chamaeleontis, Mu1
Durchmusterung objects
087971
049065
3983